Rudolf Schuster (born 4 January 1934) is a Slovak politician, who served as the second president of Slovakia from 1999 to 2004. He was elected on 29 May 1999 and inaugurated on 15 June. In the presidential elections of April 2004, in which he sought re-election, Schuster was defeated. He received only 7.4% of the vote, with three other candidates (more specifically Ivan Gašparovič, Vladimír Mečiar, and Eduard Kukan) receiving more than that. He was succeeded by Ivan Gašparovič.

Life and career
Schuster was born in Košice. From 1964 to 1990, he was a member of the Communist Party of Slovakia. Before becoming president, he was Mayor (Slovak: primátor) of Košice in 1983–1986 and 1994–1999 respectively. He was also the last Communist president of the Slovak National Council (1989–1990), Ambassador of Czechoslovakia to Canada (1990–1992) and a leader of the Party of Civic Understanding (SOP – Strana občianskeho porozumenia, 1998–1999).

He speaks Slovak, Czech, German (including Mantak dialect), Russian, English, and Hungarian fluently.

Schuster's father's family is of Carpathian German origin, while his mother's family is of Hungarian origin. Rudolf Schuster was married in 1961 to Irena Trojáková (died 2008) and he has two children (son Peter and daughter Ingrid) and two granddaughters. In his private life, he is a sports fan, a traveller and a writer. He is also a camera fan.

In 1998 he founded the centre-left Party of Civic Understanding (SOP – Strana občianskeho porozumenia).

In 1999 he received honorary citizenship from Miskolc, as recognition of the good cooperation between the city and Košice during his mayorship.

In 2004, Schuster sought re-election in the 2004 presidential election and received 7.4% of the votes.

Honours and awards

National 

 : Andrej Hlinka Order (2019)
 : Ľudovít Štúr Order (2019)
 : Milan Rastislav Štefánik Cross (2019)

Foreign 

 : Order of the Redeemer (2000)
 : Order of the Star of Romania (2000)
 : Knight Grand Cross of the Grand Order of King Tomislav ("For outstanding contribution to the promotion of friendship and development co-operation between the Republic of Croatia and the Slovak Republic." – Zagreb, 2 October 2001)
 : Order of Merit (2001)
 : Knight Grand Cross with Grand Cordon of the Order of Merit of the Italian Republic (28 June 2002)
 : Order of Isabella the Catholic (1 July 2002)
 : Royal Order of the Seraphim (2002)
 : Order of the White Eagle (2002)
 : Hungarian Order of Merit (2003)
 : Order of the Athir (2003)
 : Order of the White Lion (2019)

See also
 List of presidents of Slovakia
 Slovakia presidential election, 1999
 2004 Slovakia presidential election
 List of leaders of Slovak parliaments
 List of political parties in Slovakia

References

External links 
 President Rudolf Schuster‘s official webpage

|-

1934 births
Living people
Politicians from Košice
Slovak communists
Slovak Roman Catholics
Presidents of Slovakia
People of Hungarian German descent
Slovak people of German descent
Grand Crosses with Chain of the Order of Merit of the Republic of Hungary (civil)
Recipients of the Order of the Star of Romania
Knights Grand Cross with Collar of the Order of Merit of the Italian Republic
Communist Party of Czechoslovakia politicians
Ambassadors of Czechoslovakia to Canada
Collars of the Order of Isabella the Catholic
Recipients of the Order of the White Lion
Recipients of the Order of the White Eagle (Poland)
Recipients of the Order of Prince Yaroslav the Wise, 1st class
Members of the National Council (Slovakia) 1998-2002